Conomodulus is a small genus of sea snails representing one extinct and one extant species. This genus of snails was first formally named in 2014 by Bernard Landau, Geerat J. Vermeij, and Sonja Reich. The name Conomodulus refers to the conical spire and familial name, Modulidae.

Species
, there are two species in the genus Conomodulus:
Conomodulus neocaledonensis 
†Conomodulus preangerensis

References

Modulidae